Avi Alfasi (born December 18, 1980) is a former Israeli footballer.

Honours
Toto Cup (Leumit) (1):
2004-05
Liga Alef (1):
2010-11
Liga Leumit:
Runner-up (2): 2004-05, 2008–09

References

External links
 

1980 births
Living people
Maccabi Netanya F.C. players
Hapoel Nir Ramat HaSharon F.C. players
Hapoel Kfar Saba F.C. players
Hapoel Acre F.C. players
Maccabi Umm al-Fahm F.C. players
Maccabi Ironi Kfar Yona F.C. players
Footballers from Netanya
Israeli Premier League players
Liga Leumit players
Association football midfielders
Israeli footballers